Thadukkassery is a village in Keralassery Grama Panchayath, Palakkad District, in the Kerala state of India.

References

Villages in Palakkad district